Wild America is the second album released by the hard rock band Tora Tora.

Critical reception

Chris Czynszak of Decibel Geek says, "This album hit the shelves amidst a tidal wave of grunge music that was taking over the airwaves. The musical climate at the time relegated it to a slot just outside the Billboard Top 100. While it didn't get its just due back then, Chris and Aaron set out this week to shine a spotlight on this rock n’ roll masterpiece"

Track listing

Personnel

Anthony Corder – lead vocals, background vocals
Keith Douglas – acoustic guitar, electric guitar
Patrick Francis – bass
John Patterson – drum, percussion

Additional musicians

"Dead Man's Hand"
Memphis Horns
Wayne Jackson – trumpet
Andrew Love – sax
Jim Spake – Baritone sax
Clarence McDonald – piano

"As Time Goes By"
Greg Redding – Hammond B3

"Nowhere to Go But Down"
Tommy Burroughs – Mandolin
Peter Hyrka – Strings

Additional background vocals

Jim Jamison
Tim Dills
Jimmy Bridges
The Jagermeisters, backing shouts on "Amnesia"
Anthony, Keith, Patrick, John, Jeff & Bryan

Production

Eric Howard – Dass Dept.
Mark Howard – Drum Dept.
Kirk Koehler – Guitar Dept.
Joe Serling – Legal Dept.
Chuck Beeson – Art Direction, Front Cover design
Jean Krikorian – Package Design
Jeff Katz – Photography

Track information and credits adapted from the album's liner notes.

Charts

References

1992 albums
Tora Tora albums